Athletes from Belarus began their Olympic participation at the 1952 Summer Games in Helsinki, Finland, as part of the Soviet Union (IOC code: URS). After the Soviet Union disbanded in 1991, Belarus, along with four of the other fourteen former Soviet republics, competed in the 1992 Winter Olympics (held in Albertville, France) as the Unified Team. Later in 1992, Belarus joined eleven republics to compete as the Unified Team at the Summer Games in Barcelona, Spain. Two years later, Belarus competed for the first time as an independent nation in the 1994 Winter Olympics, held in Lillehammer, Norway. 

With a total of 105 medals, Belarus is ranked third amongst post-Soviet states, after Russia and Ukraine. 

In 2022, in response to the Russian invasion of Ukraine and its treatment of Belarusian athletes, Belarus was suspended from the Olympic Games.

Medal tables

Medals by Summer Games

Medals by Winter Games

Medals by summer sport

Medals by winter sport

List of medalists

Summer Olympics

Winter Olympics

Soviet Union 

Athletes from the Soviet Union began participating in the Olympic Games in 1952, winning 194 total medals in the Winter Games and 1010 at the Summer Games for a total of 1204 medals. Of those medals, 473 were gold, 376 were silver and 355 were bronze. The Belarusian collection of medals began with Mikhail Krivonosov winning silver in the hammer throw at the 1956 Summer Olympics in Melbourne, Australia. The Soviet Republic's first gold medal was won by Leonid Geishtor and Sergei Makarenko in the 1000 metre pairs canoe event during the 1960 Summer Games in Rome, Italy. The Soviet Union first competed in the Winter Olympics in 1956, located in Cortina. In 1988, the Soviet Union competed for the last time as a unified country.

Unified Team 
Gymnast Vitaly Shcherbo won six gold medals at the 1992 Summer Olympics in Barcelona.

Summer Olympic Games

1996 Atlanta 

In Belarus's first independent appearance at the Summer Olympics, the delegation took home fifteen medals: one gold, six silver and eight bronze. The first Belarusian gold medal was won by Ekaterina Karsten in the women's single sculls rowing event. The silver medals were won in athletics, shooting, and wrestling (both freestyle and Greco-Roman). The bronze medals were won in artistic gymnastics, athletics, rowing and Greco-Roman wrestling. The country sent 159 athletes to compete in 21 disciplines.

2000 Sydney 

The Belarusian government, using public funds and sponsorships, spent five million USD to prepare the athletes for the 2000 Olympics. Minister of Sports and Tourism Yevgeny Vorsin predicted that Belarus would win four gold medals during the Games. Belarus finished with three gold, three silver and 11 bronze medals. Karsten successfully defended her championship in the single sculls, with the other two gold medals won by Yanina Karolchik and Ellina Zvereva in the shot put and discus throw events, respectively. The Belarusian women took silver in both individual and team rhythmic gymnastics, with a third silver medal coming in the men's 50 metre pistol event. Bronze medals were won in hammer throwing, shooting (3), Greco-Roman wrestling, pentathlon, weight lifting (2), judo, heptathlon and discus throwing. One athlete from Belarus, Vadim Devyatovsky, was banned from Olympic competition due to testing positive for the substance nandrolone.

2004 Athens 

Belarus used leftover funds from the Sydney Games to prepare athletes to compete in the 2004 Olympics. Belarus sent to Athens 153 athletes competing in 21 disciplines. Those athletes won 15 medals: two golds, six silvers, and nine bronzes. The gold medals were won in the 100 meter dash and in judo. The silver medals were won in weightlifting (2), boxing (2), rowing and the hammer throw. The bronzes were won in shooting, the discus throw, weightlifting, cycling, rowing (2), wrestling (Greco-Roman) and canoeing/kayaking (2). Ivan Tsikhan originally won the bronze in the hammer throw, but his medal was upgraded to silver after Adrian Annus of Hungary was stripped of his gold medal due to doping. Yulia Nestsiarenka, who was not expected to do well in the 100 meter dash, took home the gold in the event. She was clocked at 10.93 seconds, beating the second place American by 0.03 seconds. Wrestler Alexander Medved was tasked to carry the national flag during the opening ceremony.

2008 Beijing 

One hundred and eighty-one athletes from Belarus competed in 28 events at the Beijing Olympics. Before the Olympics started, the National Olympic Committee of Belarus announced that medal winners would be awarded cash prizes, valued in United States dollars, from the Committee and their sponsors. Another sponsor, Belatmit, offered gold medal winners free sausage for life. The women's basketball team would be given free sausage regardless of what medal they won. The team captain was Ivan Tsikhan and fencer Alexander Romankov carried the national flag during the opening ceremonies. Overall, Belarus took home 19 medals, with four medals being gold, placing 16th in the medal standings, 13th in the total medal count.  At a ceremony bestowing state decorations on the Olympic champions President Lukashenko said his country had performed better in Beijing than they did in Athens, but he still called the Games a "missed opportunity", winning fewer gold medals than he personally had expected. However, on September 21, the IOC has asked Vadim Devyatovskiy and Ivan Tsikhan to provide the body information on why they tested positive for abnormal traces of testosterone after the completion of the hammerthrow final on August 17. If found guilty, the pair will be stripped of their respective medals and Devyatovskiy will face a lifetime ban for a second doping offense. The IOC found them guilty on December 11 and officially stripped them of their medals.
10 June 2010 – The Court of Arbitration for Sport (CAS) has upheld the appeals filed by the two Belarusian hammer throwers, Vadim Devyatovskiy and Ivan Tsikhan, against the decision of the Disciplinary Commission of the International Olympic Committee (IOC) of 11 December 2008. Consequently, the silver and bronze medals won at the 2008 Olympic Games in Beijing are to be returned to Vadim Deviyatovskiy and Ivan Tsikhan respectively.
In 2012 IAAF retested doping samples from the 2005 World Athletics Championships and shotputter Andrei Mikhnevich was found positive for 3 anabolic steroids: Clenbuterol, Methandienone and Oxandrolone. In August 2014 IOC disqualified his results from the 2008 Summer Olympics and allocated the bronze medal.

2012 London

Belarus won two gold medals at the 2012 games in London, the first being for Sergei Martynov in the men's 50m rifle prone shooting. Mixed doubles tennis players Max Mirnyi and Victoria Azarenka won the other gold, with Azarenka also winning a bronze in the women's singles.

2016 Rio de Janeiro

2020 Tokyo

Winter Olympic Games

1994 Lillehammer 

This was the first Olympic Games in which an independent Belarus participated. Before competing as an independent state, Belarusian athletes won four medals as part of the USSR and CIS squads from Olympic Games spanning 1964 to 1992. Belarus sent 33 athletes to compete in seven disciplines. Silver medals were won by Igor Zhelezovski in the 1000 m speed skating and Svetlana Paramygina in the biathlon. Out of the 67 nations that competed, Belarus ranked 15th in the medal totals. According to the NOC RB, competing in the Lillehammer Olympics is a historic event for Belarus and "opened a new page in the history of Belarusian sport."

1998 Nagano 

Belarus sent a delegation of 59 athletes to compete in nine disciplines. Belarus medaled twice, both times with bronze. The medals were earned by Dmitry Dashchinsky in aerials and Alexei Aidarov in the biathlon. Belarus qualified for the second round of the hockey tournament, but lost its group matches and was eliminated by Russia in the quarterfinals, finishing seventh overall. In a speech by President Alexander Lukashenko in 2002, he reflected on the achievements of athletes in the Nagano Games. While watching the events, he stated that the Belarusian athletes competed with dignity and brought glory to Belarus.

2002 Salt Lake City 

Belarus competed in nine disciplines, just like at the 1998 Winter Olympics. Belarus's single medal was a bronze won by Aleksei Grishin.  The men's ice hockey team drew international attention for its upset of top-seeded Sweden and subsequent 4th-place finish. However, hockey team member Vasily Pankov, along with Belarusian team doctor Evgeni Lositski, were removed from the Olympic Games due to positive doping results. Lositski was barred from coming to the 2004 and 2006 Olympic Games for giving Pankov medication that included nandrolone. Another Belarusian athlete was given a "strong warning" by the IOC for missing a doping test and admonished the NOC RB for helping her miss the test.

2006 Turin 

Sending 33 athletes, Belarus competed in eight disciplines. Dmitry Dashchinsky took home the only medal, a silver in the aerials. Dashchinsky had earned a bronze medal at the 1998 Nagano Games. The result was upsetting to Alexander Lukashenko, President of Belarus and head of the National Olympic Committee. He told members of the NOC RB that the coaches were to blame for the poor showing and that Belarus needed victories so they could feel pride as a nation. He also told the assembled members that if there are any more poor showings, he will fire the members.

2010 Vancouver 

Belarus won three medals. Alexei Grishin took the nation's first-ever gold in freestyle skiing – men's aerials. Sergey Novikov took silver in the men's 20-kilometers individual biathlon, while Darya Domracheva took bronze in the women's 15-kilometer individual biathlon. The men's hockey team was eliminated in the first round of playoffs.

2014 Sochi

Belarus ranked 8th, its highest at any Olympic Games, after winning five golds and a bronze. Biathlete Darya Domracheva won three golds, in the women's pursuit, individual and mass start events. Nadzeya Skardzina won the bronze in the individual. In freestyle skiing, Alla Tsuper and Anton Kushnir won golds in the respective women's and men's aerial events.

2018 Pyeongchang

2022 Beijing

Flag bearers

National Olympic Committee 

In 1991, an order was issued to create the National Olympic Committee of the Republic of Belarus, and it was not until 1993 before the NOC RB (НОК РБ) became a full member of the International Olympic Committee.  Also in 1993, Vladimir Ryzhenkov, who was at the time the Belarus Minister for Sport and Tourism, was elected to the post of President of the NOC RB. In May 1997, a year after the death of Ryzhenkov, President of Belarus Alexander Lukashenko was elected to the post, which he still holds today. Lukashenko is the first known example of a head of state to also lead a National Olympic Committee at the same time. Funding for the NOC RB comes from marketing of goods with the Olympic logo, donations from the private sector, sponsorships and from the national government. As head of state, President Lukashenko issued decrees awarding prizes to those who bring home medals, use state funds to prepare for athletes and pay the coaches of the athletes. In 2004, President Lukashenko issued a decree awarding those who win medals in the 2004 and 2006 Olympic Games the following tax-free monetary awards (in United States dollars): $60,000 for gold, $30,000 for silver and $20,000 for bronze. For the 2008 and 2010 games, the following tax-free prizes will be awarded to medal winners and their coaches (in United States dollars): $100,000 for gold, $50,000 for silver and $30,000 for bronze.

See also

 List of flag bearers for Belarus at the Olympics
 Belarus at the Paralympics

References

External links 
 
 
 
 Official website of the NOCRB